Jansin Turgut (born 8 March 1996) is a Turkey international rugby league footballer who plays as a back row forward. He previously played for Hull FC and Salford. Turgut captained the Turkish national team during their international debut at the 2018 Emerging Nations World Championship.

Background
Turgut was born in Kingston upon Hull, Humberside, England, and is of Turkish descent through his father.

Playing career

Early career
Turgut represented England Academy (u18) against the Australian Schoolboys in 2014.

Hull
Turgut made his Hull F.C. début on 5 March 2015 in a Super League match against Leeds Rhinos at the KC Stadium.

Doncaster
In 2015, Turgut was dual registered with Championship club Doncaster. He made his Dons début on 15 March 2015 in a match against Hunslet.

Salford
Turgut joined Salford Red Devils "on a short-term deal" towards the end of the 2018 season.

Coaching
On 17 Jun 2020 it was announced that he had joined the coaching staff of West Hull A.R.L.F.C.

Personal
On 21 May 2019, it was reported that Turgut had fallen three storeys; attaining severe injuries and being put on life support.

On 25 Jan 2020 he admitted that the fall from a third storey car park in Ibiza had been a suicide attempt.

References

External links
Hull F.C. profile
SL profile

1996 births
Living people
Doncaster R.L.F.C. players
English people of Turkish descent
English rugby league players
Featherstone Rovers players
Hull F.C. players
Rugby league centres
Rugby league locks
Rugby league players from Kingston upon Hull
Rugby league second-rows
Salford Red Devils players
Turkey national rugby league team captains
Turkey national rugby league team players